Vomeronasal receptors are a class of olfactory receptors that putatively function as receptors for pheromones. Pheromones have evolved in all animal phyla, to signal sex and dominance status, and are responsible for stereotypical social and sexual behaviour among members of the same species. In mammals, these chemical signals are believed to be detected primarily by the vomeronasal organ (VNO), a chemosensory organ located at the base of the nasal septum.

The VNO is present in most amphibia, reptiles and non-primate mammals but is absent in birds, adult catarrhine monkeys and apes. An active role for the human VNO in the detection of pheromones is disputed; the VNO is clearly present in the fetus but appears to be atrophied or absent in adults. Two distinct families of vomeronasal receptors – which putatively function as pheromone receptors – have been identified in the vomeronasal organ (V1Rs and V2Rs). While all are G protein-coupled receptors (GPCRs), they are distantly related to the receptors of the main olfactory system, highlighting their different role.

The V1 receptors share between 50 and 90% sequence identity but have little similarity to other families of G protein-coupled receptors. They appear to be distantly related to the mammalian T2R bitter taste receptors and the rhodopsin-like GPCRs. In rat, the family comprises 30–40 genes. These are expressed in the apical regions of the VNO, in neurons expressing Gi2. Coupling of the receptors to this protein mediates inositol trisphosphate signaling. A number of human V1 receptor homologues have also been found. The majority of these human sequences are pseudogenes, but an apparently functional receptor has been identified that is expressed in the human olfactory system.

The V2 receptors are members of GPCR family 3 and have close similarity to the extracellular calcium-sensing receptors. Rodents appear to have around 100 functional V2 receptors and many pseudogenes. These receptors are expressed in the basal regions of VNO, where they couple to G proteins to mediate inositol trisphosphate responses. Homologues have also been identified in fish, and the ligand specificity of one such receptor has been determined: a receptor from goldfish olfactory epithelium has been reported to bind basic amino acids, which are odorants for fish.

Human proteins containing this domain
V1
VN1R1
VN1R2
VN1R3
VN1R5
V2: None in humans. Vmn2r116 and Vmn2r26 are examples in mice.

See also
 Olfaction
 Trace amine-associated receptor
 Membrane steroid receptor

References 

G protein-coupled receptors
Protein families
Olfactory system